Wolfgang Sidka (born 26 May 1954 in Lengerich) is a football manager and former player. As a manager, he led SV Werder Bremen to victory in the UEFA Intertoto Cup in 1998. He was head coach of the Iraq national team between 9 August 2010 and 2 August 2011.

Managerial record

References

Living people
1954 births
People from Lengerich, Westphalia
Sportspeople from Münster (region)
Association football midfielders
West German footballers
Hertha BSC players
TSV 1860 Munich players
SV Werder Bremen players
VfB Oldenburg players
Bundesliga players
2. Bundesliga players
German football managers
Tennis Borussia Berlin managers
Arminia Bielefeld managers
SV Werder Bremen managers
Bundesliga managers
Bahrain national football team managers
Al-Arabi SC (Qatar) managers
FC Oberneuland managers
2011 AFC Asian Cup managers
VfL Osnabrück managers
Iraq national football team managers
Footballers from North Rhine-Westphalia